Arnold Mills Historic District is a historic district encompassing a modest 19th-century mill village in eastern Cumberland, Rhode Island.  The district lies along the Nate Whipple Highway (Rhode Island Route 120) and Sneech Pond Road, south of the Arnold Mills Reservoir.  Sneech Pond Road was formerly the major east-west highway through the area prior to the construction of the Nate Whipple Highway in the 1960s.  The Arnold Mills village is in part bisected by Abbott Run, the stream which serves as the outlet of the reservoir; Sneech Pond Road crosses the run on an early 20th-century steel Pratt pony truss, now closed to vehicular traffic.  The houses along this road generally date from the late 18th to mid-19th century, and mainly reflect Federal and Greek Revival styling.  The most prominent structure in the district is the Arnold Mills United Methodist Church, located at the western end of the district on Nate Whipple Highway; it was built 1825-27 and remodeled in 1846.

The district was listed on the National Register of Historic Places in 1978.

See also
National Register of Historic Places listings in Providence County, Rhode Island

References

Buildings and structures in Cumberland, Rhode Island
Historic districts in Providence County, Rhode Island
Historic districts on the National Register of Historic Places in Rhode Island
National Register of Historic Places in Providence County, Rhode Island